Wright's Bridge is a historic covered bridge in Newport, New Hampshire. Originally built in 1906 to carry the Boston and Maine Railroad across the Sugar River, it now carries the multi-use Sugar River Trail. The bridge was listed on the National Register of Historic Places in 1975.

Description and history
The bridge is a single-span Town double-lattice truss structure which has been reinforced by laminated arches. The portals have vertical boards along the sides, and horizontal boards above the opening. Elements of the trusses and arches are joined by a combination of wooden pegging, iron reinforcing rods, and metal turnbuckles.

The bridge is named for S. K. Wright, who sold this portion of the railroad right-of-way in 1871. The first bridge on the site was built soon afterward, by the Sugar River Railroad which originally built this section of railroad. Its successor, the Boston & Maine, built this replacement structure in 1906. The line was operated by the B&M until 1954 when it was sold to the Claremont & Concord Railway. The C&C last ran to Newport in 1977 and the line was subsequently abandoned. The bridge is one of two surviving railroad bridges on the line; the other is Pier Bridge.

See also

List of bridges documented by the Historic American Engineering Record in New Hampshire
List of bridges on the National Register of Historic Places in New Hampshire
List of New Hampshire covered bridges
National Register of Historic Places listings in Sullivan County, New Hampshire

References

External links

New Hampshire DHR page on Wright's Bridge (dated info)

Covered bridges on the National Register of Historic Places in New Hampshire
Bridges completed in 1906
Bridges in Sullivan County, New Hampshire
Historic American Engineering Record in New Hampshire
National Register of Historic Places in Sullivan County, New Hampshire
Newport, New Hampshire
Railroad bridges on the National Register of Historic Places in New Hampshire
Wooden bridges in New Hampshire
Lattice truss bridges in the United States
1906 establishments in New Hampshire